Arthur Frederick Goode III (March 28, 1954  – April 5, 1984) was a convicted child murderer who was electrocuted in Florida in 1984.

Goode, who was borderline mentally retarded, began to show the behavior of a pedophile in his teenage years and got into trouble with the law early, but was always released when his parents posted bail. In mid-1975, after several reprobations of child abuse (among those the molestation of a boy of 9 years and one of 11 years), Goode was sentenced to five years of probation under the condition of psychological treatment at Spring Grove Hospital Center in Baltimore. Goode admitted himself to the treatment for several days but then left the institution and journeyed to Cape Coral, Florida, where his parents had moved.

On March 5, 1976, Goode committed the murder for which he was to be executed. In Cape Coral, he happened upon 9-year-old Jason VerDow, lured him into the woods, abused and then strangled him. Afterwards, he traveled back to Baltimore, where he abducted 10-year-old Billy Arthes and took him to Washington, D.C. There he met 11-year-old Kenneth Dawson and took both boys with him on a bus trip to Falls Church, Virginia, where he murdered Dawson with Arthes being present. Goode was apprehended by the police after a woman recognized Billy Arthes (who had since been reported as kidnapped but was physically unharmed on Goode's arrest). On being arrested, Goode told the officers: "You can't do nothing to me. I'm sick."

A jury in Maryland found him sane and guilty of murder and gave him a life sentence. Hereafter, he also received a trial in Florida for the murder of Jason VerDow. He was permitted to conduct his own defense and was sentenced to death on March 21, 1977.

Goode's father described him as, "crazier than hell and dumber than a box of rocks."

One month before his death, Goode was interviewed by John Waters for the Baltimore City Paper. Goode admitted to being a pedophile and to slaying the two boys, but saw his actions as some kind of "protest against society". He also said that if pedophiles were punished less strictly, they wouldn't need to hide by murdering their victims.
Goode was said to be one of the most hated men on Florida's death row. He wrote countless letters to school teachers, seeking children for pen pals, and also to the parents of the boys he murdered, boasting of  his crimes. He had a fixation with the child actor Ricky Schroder, and during an interview on the eve of his execution, he was asked if he had any last request. With a smile, he answered, "Yes, I want Ricky Schroder to sit on my lap when I am strapped into the electric chair." During the interview, he joked with reporters and had no remorse for the killing of the young boy.

For his last meal, Goode had steak, corn, broccoli and cookies. He also reportedly requested to have intercourse with a little boy for the last time.
Arthur Goode was killed by electrocution on April 5, 1984. His last words were, "I have remorse for the two boys I murdered. But it's hard for me to show it."

Years later when asked to reflect on his involvement in executions, Warden Richard Dugger said, "Arthur Goode was the hardest. I had some real reservations about that one. Let's face it - he was a nut."

See also 
 Capital punishment in Florida
 Capital punishment in the United States
 List of people executed in Florida

References

1954 births
1984 deaths
American murderers of children
American rapists
20th-century executions by Florida
American people convicted of child sexual abuse
American people executed for murder
People executed by Florida by electric chair
People convicted of murder by Florida
People convicted of murder by Maryland
People from Hyattsville, Maryland
20th-century executions of American people
Prisoners sentenced to life imprisonment by Maryland
Executed people from Maryland
Violence against men in North America
Incidents of violence against boys